Duke of Bailén is a hereditary title in the peerage of Spain accompanied by the dignity of Grandee and granted in 1833 by Ferdinand VII to Francisco Javier Castaños for his military achievements during the Peninsular War as Captain general of the Royal Spanish Armies, becoming the first man to defeat Napoleon in an open field battle.

It is a victory title, and was bestowed on General Castaños following his successful command at the Battle of Bailén in July 1808.

Dukes of Bailén (1833)

 Francisco Javier Castaños y Aragorri, 1st Duke of Bailén
 Luis Carondelet y Castaños, 2nd Duke of Bailén
 Eduardo Carondelet y Dorado, 3rd Duke of Bailén
 María de la Encarnación Fernández de Córdoba y Carondelet, 4th Duchess of Bailén
 José María Cavero y Goicoerrotea, 5th Duke of Bailén
 Juan Manuel Cavero de Carondelet y Bally, 6th Duke of Bailén
 Francisco Javier Cavero de Carondelet y Christou, 7th Duke of Bailén

See also
List of dukes in the peerage of Spain
List of current Grandees of Spain

References

Bibliography
 

Dukedoms of Spain
Grandees of Spain
Lists of dukes
Lists of Spanish nobility
Noble titles created in 1833